Histrionic may refer to:
 related to or reminiscent of (theatrical) acting, or acting out
 Histrionic personality disorder, a Cluster B personality disorder
 Histrionics (album), by The Higher
 Histrionicus, a genus of ducks

See also
 Histrionicotoxin, toxins found in the skin of poison frogs